The Philippines national korfball team is the team which represents the Philippines in international korfball competitions. It is sanctioned and managed by the Philippine Korfball Federation.

Background
Korfball was introduced in the Philippines at the University of Santo Tomas (UST) in 2007. Korfball was brought in by a delegation of UST's Institute of Physical Education and Athletics which attended a korfball seminar workshop in Hong Kong. The Philippine Korfball Federation (PKF) was established within the year. The PKF became a member of the International Korfball Federation (IKF) on September 13, 2014.

A national youth team was formed which joined the 2015 Under-23 Asia-Oceania Korfball Championship; their first IKF-sanctioned international event. A senior team was eventually formed with the Philippines making their Asia-Oceania Korfball Championship debut in the 2018 edition which was hosted in Japan.

Tournament history

References

Philippines
Korfball
National team